Aphnaeum (Aphnaion) was an ancient city and former bishopric in Egypt. It is currently a Latin Catholic titular see. Its location is believed to be near the ruins of modern Tell-Defenneh.

History 
Aphnaeum was important enough in the Egyptian Roman province of Augustamnica Secunda to become a suffragan bishopric of the Metropolitan of provincial capital Pelusium, but it faded with the town.

Titular see 
It was nominally restored in 1933.

It is vacant, having had only two incumbents, both of the lowest (episcopal) rank :
 Joseph Alexander Fernandes (1949.01.24 – 1951.04.12) as Auxiliary Bishop of Calcutta (India) (1949.01.24 – 1951.04.12), later Metropolitan Archbishop of Delhi and Simla (India) (1951.04.12 – 1959.06.04), restyled Metropolitan Archbishop of Delhi (1959.06.04 – 1967.09.16), also Apostolic Administrator of Simla and Chandigarh (India) (1966 – 1967.04.13)
 Gregorio Espiga e Infante, Augustinian Recollects (O.A.R.) (1955.07.03 – 1997.04.15) as Apostolic Vicar of Palawan (Philippines) (1955.07.03 – 1987.12.18)

Source and External links 
 GigaCatholic, with titular incumbent biography links

Catholic titular sees in Africa